William Wesley Asbury (born February 22, 1943) is a former professional American football running back in the National Football League (NFL).

References

External links
 NFL.com profile

1943 births
Living people
American football running backs
Kent State Golden Flashes football players
Pittsburgh Steelers players
People from Crawfordville, Georgia
Players of American football from Georgia (U.S. state)